Remember My Name is a 1978 American thriller drama film written and directed by Alan Rudolph. It stars Geraldine Chaplin, Anthony Perkins, Moses Gunn, Jeff Goldblum, and Berry Berenson.

Plot 
Neil Curry (Perkins) is living a happy life with his second wife Barbara (Berenson) in California after abandoning his first wife Emily (Chaplin) in New York. Their life of domestic bliss is interrupted when Emily comes back from prison, where she had served a 12-year sentence for murdering Neil's former lover. She arrives in California to wreak havoc and to claim Neil back.

Cast 
 Geraldine Chaplin as Emily
 Anthony Perkins as Neil Curry
 Moses Gunn as Pike
 Berry Berenson as Barbara Curry
 Jeff Goldblum as Mr. Nudd
 Timothy Thomerson as Jeff
 Alfre Woodard as Rita
 Marilyn Coleman as Teresa
 Jeffrey S. Perry as Harry
 Alan Autry as Rusty (as Carlos Brown)
 Dennis Franz as Franks

Production 
Rudolph described the film as "an update of the classic woman's melodramas of the Bette Davis, Barbara Stanwyck, Joan Crawford era."

Soundtrack 
The film's soundtrack was composed of songs written for the film and original recordings by singer and composer Alberta Hunter, a veteran of the 1920s–30s nightclub scene and Broadway who appeared in the musicals Shuffle Along and Show Boat with the London cast. The 82-year-old Hunter was in the midst of a musical reemergence when the film was released, having left show business for 20 years after the death of her mother to become a nurse.

Reception

Critical response 
On review aggregator website Rotten Tomatoes, the film holds an approval rating of 70% based on 10 reviews.

The San Francisco Chronicle gave the film 4 out of 5 stars, praising Perkins and describing Chaplin's performance as "extraordinary" and that she "adopts a unique speech pattern as Emily. She says everything as though she's rehearsed it and now is blurting it out in what she hopes will be accepted as a reasonable replica of casual speech. Emily's manner only loses its furtive, dodging quality when she feels in control or when she flies into a rage." The review also praises how Rudolph "embellishes his film with sardonic humor" and the "comically macabre touch" of TV news in the background of disasters such as an earthquake that killed one million people in Budapest.

The Washington Post described the film as a "neurotic film noir" that is also a "gripping tale of sexual frustration." The reviewer was also impressed with Chaplin's performance: "Chaplin is spooky, spookier even than Perkins, in this complex performance as a woman who's painfully adjusting to freedom." Jack Kroll of Newsweek praised Rudolph's direction: "he has a real eye for the visual paradox, the elegant and even beautiful form in which this savagery sometimes works." The review praised Perkins as a "specialist at playing the 'nice guy' whose smile and sweat suggest something not so nice underneath." Kroll also heaped praise on Chaplin, saying that her performance "creates something new in the modern pantheon of weirdos. She is chilling in her ability to be both guilty and innocent, victim and predator, catatonic and driven by feelings so deep they draw blood."

Accolades

References

External links 
 
 
 
 
 

1970s thriller drama films
1978 films
American films about revenge
American independent films
American thriller drama films
Films about stalking
Films directed by Alan Rudolph
Films set in California
Columbia Pictures films
1970s English-language films
1970s American films